Romanum is an island and municipality in the state of Chuuk, Federated States of Micronesia. It had a population of 422 people as of the 1988 census, and an area of 0.8 square kilometers. The king: Rvi, but he signed off later on and a Queen replaced him : Kanisa

References
Statoids.com, retrieved December 8, 2010
http://islands.unep.ch/CLV.htm

Municipalities of Chuuk State
Islands of Chuuk State